Eutropiichthys vacha is a species of schilbid catfish native to India, Nepal, Bhutan, and Bangladesh. It can reach a length of 34 cm, and a mass of 1.35 kg.
Eutropiichthys vacha is a climate sensitive species that may be selected as a target species for climate change impact studies. Region-specific adaptation was noticed in breeding phenology of this schilbid catfish in River Ganga, based on local trends of warming climate. A threshold water temperature around 24 °C and rainfall of > 100 mm were found to be necessary for attainment of breeding GSI (> 3.5 units) in E. vacha. It appears that warming climate may have the most profound effect on gonad maturation and spawning in E. vacha.

References

Schilbeidae
Fish of Asia
Taxa named by Francis Buchanan-Hamilton
Fish described in 1822